Tehetu Township (Mandarin: 特合土乡) is a township in Darlag County, Golog Tibetan Autonomous Prefecture, Qinghai, China. In 2010, Tehetu Township had a total population of 1,600: 831 males and 769 females: 549 aged under 14, 991 aged between 15 and 65 and 60 aged over 65.

References 

Township-level divisions of Qinghai
Golog Tibetan Autonomous Prefecture